Yoshie Takeuchi may refer to:

 Yoshie Takeuchi (announcer) (born 1986), Japanese TV announcer
 Yoshie Takeuchi (fencer) (born 1932), Japanese Olympic fencer